KYKM may refer to:

 The ICAO code for Yakima Air Terminal
 KYKM (FM), a radio station (94.3 FM) licensed to Yoakum, Texas, United States